Christina Sheila Jordan is a Malaysian-born British politician. She served as a Brexit Party Member of the European Parliament (MEP) for South West England from 2019 to 2020.

Early life
Christina Sheila Jordan was born in Malaysia. She worked as a secretary in the Turkish Embassy in Kuala Lumpur before moving to the United Kingdom (UK) in 1985. She voted for Brexit in the 2016 United Kingdom European Union membership referendum. Prior to her election as an MEP, Jordan worked as a cabin crew member for British Airways for ten years, and trained as a nurse at Royal Hampshire County Hospital, Winchester. For her work with charities in the community, she was awarded the Hampshire High Sheriff Award for Services to the Community, and attended the Queen's Garden Party at Buckingham Palace in 2015.

European Parliament
She stood as a candidate in the 2019 European parliamentary election for the Brexit Party. Jordan was third on her party's list, and was elected as one of its three MEPs in the South West England constituency along with Ann Widdecombe and James Glancy. In the European Parliament, Jordan was a member of the Committee on the Environment, Public Health, and Food Safety, and was part of the delegation for relations with India.

Personal life
Jordan is married and has two daughters.

References

External links 

 European Parliament
 Christina Jordan on Twitter
 

1962 births
Living people
MEPs for England 2019–2020
Brexit Party MEPs
21st-century women MEPs for England
British people of Malaysian descent
British politicians of Malaysian descent
British women nurses
British charity and campaign group workers
People from Salisbury
Flight attendants